Michael Domagala (born September 28, 1995) is a professional Canadian football placekicker for the Edmonton Elks of the Canadian Football League (CFL).

University career 
Domagala played U Sports football for the Carleton from 2013 to 2018. He played in 42 games for the Ravens where he was successful on 73 of 96 field goal attempts for a 76.0% completion rate and punted 347 times for a 38.8-yard average. Domagala was not selected in the 2017 CFL Draft and instead completed his final two seasons of eligibility with Carleton.

Professional career

Hamilton Tiger-Cats
After completing his university career, he signed as a free agent with the Hamilton Tiger-Cats on December 12, 2018. He played in the first pre-season game of the 2019 season where he made one of two field goal attempts, punted eight times for a 49.9-yard average, and had six kickoffs for a 60.8-yard average, but was released by the team on June 9, 2019. He was not signed by any other team and did not play in 2019. Due to the cancellation of the 2020 CFL season, he was also un-signed in 2020.

On July 10, 2021, it was announced that Domagala had re-signed with the Tiger-Cats. He was signed to the team's practice roster to begin the 2021 season where he spent the first two games. Following the team's bye week, Domagala was promoted to the active roster and made his regular season professional debut on August 27, 2021, in a game against the Montreal Alouettes. He converted his first career field goal attempt which was from 12 yards out and finished the game with two field goals out of four attempts and had five kickoffs for a 60.6-yard average.

Edmonton Elks
Domagala joined the Edmonton Elks in free agency on February 16, 2023.

References

External links 
Hamilton Tiger-Cats bio

1995 births
Living people
Canadian football placekickers
Carleton Ravens football players
Hamilton Tiger-Cats players
Players of Canadian football from Ontario
Sportspeople from St. Catharines